Bastille Day (released as The Take in North America and on international home release) is a 2016 action thriller film co-written and directed by James Watkins. It is a Luxembourgish, French and American venture produced by Anonymous Content, Vendôme Pictures, TF1 Films Production and StudioCanal. The film stars Idris Elba, Richard Madden, Charlotte Le Bon, Eriq Ebouaney and José Garcia. The film was released in the United Kingdom on 22 April 2016 and 13 July 2016 in France, and on 18 November 2016 in the United States.

Plot

On the eve of Bastille Day in Paris, American drifter and pickpocket Michael Mason steals a woman's handbag, not knowing that it contains explosives. After taking the cash from the bag, he discards it, caught unwittingly on CCTV as he does so. The bag then detonates and kills four people. Upon being captured by CIA agent Sean Briar, who is being reprimanded for irresponsible conduct on the job, Mason protests that he is not a terrorist, and tells Briar that the bag contained a cellphone owned by a woman named Zoé. The bomb was set up by a group of corrupt policemen led by Rafi Bertrand, all of them members in the French special force RAPID who intend to pull a robbery at the Bank of France. Zoé was told to plant the bomb at the office of the French Nationalist Party (as part of a diversion for the heist), but after seeing the night cleaning crew arrive, she was unwilling to kill innocents and so abandoned the plan. Zoé's boyfriend Jean, one of the conspirators, allows her to escape, realizing that his compatriots will kill her.

The group tracks Zoé's phone to Briar's and Mason's location. Briar engages the conspirators, who subdue him, while Mason escapes. Bertrand's team proceeds to plant fake evidence at a mosque and stir up a nationwide uproar among its Islamic population, using agitating hashtags on the Internet. Chased by the French authorities and Bertrand's forces, Mason is picked up by Briar, who has come to believe his story and intends to clear the case with his help, even against the orders of his superiors. They track Zoé to the hideout of her friend Paul and his motorcycle gang, but the gang firebombs their car to cover their escape. Appropriating another car, they track Paul down to the bar where he works, and Mason instigates a brawl, during which he steals Paul's identity card.

Mason and Briar use the card to find out Paul's address, where Zoé is hiding, and manage to gain her cooperation. Zoé leads them to Jean's apartment, where they find his body and an ID and badge identifying him as a police officer. Briar informs his colleague, Karen Dacre, who confers with her French contact, DGSI Director Victor Gamieux, about taking Mason and Zoé into protective custody. However, Gamieux, actually the mastermind of the heist conspiracy, kills Dacre after obtaining the information he needs and sends a pickup team consisting of his henchmen. Briar, Mason and Zoe manage to pick up clues about the men's true allegiance and fight their way out of the deathtrap. Now realizing Gamieux's hand in the game, the three head toward the Bank of France.

When a crowd of protestors masses at the front of the bank – as the conspirators have intended – Gamieux assigns Bertrand's RAPID team to the building to provide interior security, thus facilitating the digital robbery of its entire monetary reserves (half a billion euros). Upon arriving at the bank, Briar disguises himself as a RAPID officer and manages to gain access to the building before he is found out. Hearing of his predicament over their stolen police van's radio, Zoe and Mason start a riot among the protestors, who storm the bank and overpower the RAPID troopers closing in on Briar. Briar subsequently infiltrates the vault and engages Bertrand and his remaining henchman. Bertrand escapes with the USB flash drive on which the money has been downloaded, but Briar contacts Mason, who steals the flash drive from Bertrand. Upon noticing the theft, Bertrand takes Zoe hostage. Gamieux, trying to salvage his plan, commands a squad of policemen to shoot and kill Bertrand, and Mason escapes with the flash drive. Zoé survives.

Some time later, Mason, working with Briar and French law enforcement, meets with Gamieux on the pretense of trading the flash drive for a passport and a ride out of the country, leading to the latter's arrest.

Cast
 Idris Elba as Sean Briar, a CIA agent. 
 Richard Madden as Michael Mason, an American pickpocket living in Paris.
 Charlotte Le Bon as Zoé Naville, an anti-fascist protestor. 
 Kelly Reilly as Karen Dacre, a senior CIA agent. 
 José Garcia as Victor Gamieux, the director of the DGSI.
 Thierry Godard as Rafi Bertrand, a corrupt commander in the French National Police RAPID Unit. 
 Anatol Yusef as Tom Luddy, leader of the CIA surveillance unit in Paris.
 Eriq Ebouaney as Baba, Mason's black market contact for stolen goods.
 Arieh Worthalter as Jean
 Stéphane Caillard as Beatrice

Production
On 11 November 2013, Idris Elba joined the cast of the film. On 2 October 2014, Richard Madden joined the cast. On 18 May 2014, Focus Features acquired the rights to distribute the film in North America. Principal photography began on 13 October 2014 in Paris, and ended on 17 December 2014.

Release
In the United Kingdom, StudioCanal scheduled the film to be released on 19 February 2016. However, following the terrorist attacks in Paris in November 2015, the film was delayed. Bastille Day was released simultaneously in the United Kingdom, Ireland and Sweden on 22 April 2016. In France, the film was released on 13 July 2016 to coincide with the dates in the story. Following the 2016 Nice truck attack, Studiocanal pulled the film from theatres on 17 July 2016, citing it as a "sign of respect for the victims and their families."

Reception 
On Rotten Tomatoes, the film holds an approval rating of 48% based on 80 reviews, with an average rating of 5.2/10. The site's critical consensus reads, "Bastille Day proves Idris Elba is an action hero in waiting – specifically, waiting for a script that deserves his talents." On Metacritic, the film has a weighted average score of 48 out of 100, based on 16 critics, indicating "mixed or average reviews".

References

External links
  
 

2016 films
2016 action thriller films
American action thriller films
English-language French films
French action thriller films
Focus Features films
Vendôme Pictures films
Films produced by Steve Golin
Films scored by Alex Heffes
Films about terrorism in Europe
Luxembourgian thriller films
English-language Luxembourgian films
StudioCanal films
Holiday-themed films
2010s English-language films
Films directed by James Watkins
2010s American films
2010s French films